St Gabriel's Roman Catholic High School is a coeducational Roman Catholic secondary school located in Bury, Greater Manchester, England. Founded in 1954, it became an academy sponsored by the St Teresa of Calcutta Catholic Academy Trust in 2020.

History 
The main school building was opened in 1954. From 1954 to 2020, it was a voluntary aided school administered by Bury Metropolitan Borough Council, and later gained status as a specialist Science College. The school celebrated its Diamond anniversary in 2014, which was marked by a visit by the Bishop of Salford. The school's publication, Pronuntio (lit. I pronounce in Latin), had been published for many years but the final issue was produced in December 2019. In November 2020, the school became an academy school sponsored by the St Teresa of Calcutta Catholic Academy Trust.

The school's Form classes are named after Roman Catholic saints and martyrs from Lancashire and North West England and consist of Arrowsmith, Lyne, Southworth, Ward, Barlow, Clitheroe, Plessington and Rigby. Two of the form classes (Ward and Rigby) were added during the 1990s and two more (Mayne and Jones) added in the 2000s. The latter two form classes ceased to be used for Year Seven students beginning in 2019, and were dissolved school-wide in 2020, with those previously in the forms being moved to other classes.

School Facilities 
The School buildings include: the Main Building, housing the suites of science labs, the School Library and Centre and other learning facilities. The School's new St Teresa of Calcutta Chapel. The John Banks Building (named in honour of the School's former headteacher) which houses various other suites of classrooms. The Drama and Performance Arts Complex which houses the school's drama workshops and arts and music rooms. The Sports Hall and Gymnasium and the School's playing fields.

General  and GCSE Subjects
From Year Seven to Year Nine (Key Stage 3), the subjects of English; Mathematics; Religious Studies; Art; Music; Computer Science; Science; and Physical Education are all compulsory.

At GCSE level (from Year Ten onwards), students have the following options:

Headteachers

References

External links
St Gabriel's Roman Catholic High School: Official Website
 St Gabriel's Roman Catholic High School: Official Parents-Teachers Association Website
St Gabriel's Roman Catholic High School: Mission Statement

Secondary schools in the Metropolitan Borough of Bury
Catholic secondary schools in the Diocese of Salford
Educational institutions established in 1954
1954 establishments in England
Academies in the Metropolitan Borough of Bury
Schools in Bury, Greater Manchester